P. N. Menon may refer to:

 P. N. Menon (diplomat)
 P. N. Menon (director)